Chakda is a village  and a Panchayat at Nissing tehsil in Karnal district in the Indian state of Haryana. Chakda is located about 10 km from town Nissing and about 27 km from Karnal district via both state highway 8 and state highway 9.

History

This village was once known by King Chakwa Ben.  This village belonged to the Muslim population before the partition.

Religious places
 Gurudwara sahib

 Pir Baba Ji place
 Nagar khera
 Basanti mata mandir

School
 Government primary school
 saraswati public school

Places
 33kv power house
 Atal seva kendra
 Anganwadi
 government animal hospital
 Panchayat ghar
 old age home

Geography
Chakda is located at  .This village is located about 10 km from Nissing , 27 km from karnal , 31 km from kaithal , 32 km from kurushetra , 25 km from pehowa and 26 km from Assandh

Physiography
The village lies in Nardak, Khadir and Bangar area.  It has two ponds and one big river flowing from north to south .

Demographics
The populace speak the Punjabi language and are mostly Sikhs. They are predominantly agriculturists.

Administration
The village administration comes under Nissing sub-division of Karnal district. It is one among the 44 Pancahayat of Nissing at Chirao block of Karnal.

References

Villages in Karnal district